Keebra Park State High School (KPSHS), referred to as Keebra Park or Keebra,  is a co-educational public secondary school, located in the Gold Coast suburb of Southport, Queensland, Australia.

Notable alumni

Cricket
 Ingrid Cronin-Knight – International representative for the New Zealand White Ferns

Rugby league
 Corey Allan – player for the Canterbury Bulldogs
 Neccrom Areaiiti – former South Sydney Rabbitohs player and Cook Islands international
 Jesse Arthars – player for the New Zealand Warriors
 Jai Arrow – player for the South Sydney Rabbitohs and Queensland representative
 Daejarn Asi – player for the North Queensland Cowboys
 AJ Brimson – player for the Gold Coast Titans
 Tanah Boyd – player for the Gold Coast Titans
 Rangi Chase – player for the Doncaster Rovers and England international
 JJ Collins – former Wests Tigers, Newcastle and Canberra player
 Greg Eastwood – former Brisbane Broncos, Canterbury Bulldogs and Leeds player and New Zealand international
 Kenny Edwards – player for the Castleford Tigers
 Jaelen Feeney – former Newcastle Knights player
 David Fifita – player for the Gold Coast Titans and Queensland representative
 Moeaki Fotuaika – player for the Gold Coast Titans and Tonga representative
 Payne Haas – player for the Brisbane Broncos and Australian international
 Tony Hearn – former North Sydney, South Queensland and St George player and Queensland representative
 Delouise Hoeter – former Wests Tigers player and Tonga international
 Dallas Hood – former Sydney Roosters and Wakefield Trinity Wildcats player
 Brett Horsnell – former Gold Coast Giants, South Queensland Crushers and Parramatta Eels player
 Jordan Kahu – player for the Brisbane Broncos and New Zealand international
 Blake Leary – former North Queensland and Manly player
 Connelly Lemuelu – player for the North Queensland Cowboys
 Lamar Liolevave – former Wests Tigers player and Fiji international
 Isaac Liu – player for the Gold Coast Titans and New Zealand international
 Jamahl Lolesi – former Canberra, Canterbury, Wests Tigers and Huddersfield player and New Zealand international
 Robert Lui – former player for the Leeds Rhinos
 Te Maire Martin – player for the New Zealand Warriors player and New Zealand international
 Benji Marshall – Assistant Coach for the Wests Tigers and New Zealand international
 Dane McDonald – former Sheffield Eagles player
 Brad Middelbosch – former Saint-Gaudens Bears player
 Thomas Mikaele – player for the Warrington Wolves
 Sam Moa – former player for the Catalans Dragons and New Zealand international
 Tautau Moga – player for the St George Illawarra Dragons and Samoa international
 Ben Murdoch-Masila – player for the New Zealand Warriors and Tonga international
 Corey Norman – player for the Toulouse Olympique and Queensland representative
 Agnatius Paasi – player for the St Helens R.F.C and Tonga international
 Dean Parata – former Italy international
 Matt Parata – former Italy international
 Jaxson Paulo – player for the South Sydney Rabbitohs
 Leivaha Pulu – player for the New Zealand Warriors and Tonga international
 Tyronne Roberts-Davis – player for the Newcastle Knights
 Kurtis Rowe – former Wests Tigers player
 Dean Scott – former Gold Coast Seagulls player
 Marion Seve – player for the Melbourne Storm and Samoan international
 Tim Smith – former Parramatta, Cronulla, Wigan, Wakefield Trinity and Salford player
 Chris St Clair – former Balmain Tigers and Italy international
 Zahara Temara – player for the Sydney Roosters NRLW side
 Ben Te'o – player for the Brisbane Broncos, Queensland representative and former England rugby union international
 Bodene Thompson – player for the Leeds Rhinos
 Robert Tocco – former Gold Coast Seagulls, Canterbury Bulldogs and South Sydney Rabbitohs player
 Harry Tyson-Wilson – former Hull FC player
 Kim Uasi – former Tonga international
 Reece Walsh - Player for the New Zealand Warriors
 Scott Zahra – former Gold Coast Chargers player

Rugby union
 Richard Kingi – former Stade Français and Wallabies player
 Lausii Taliauli – player for the Brumbies and former Australian Sevens representative

Business 
 Matthew Miles - CEO of MS Research Australia

References

Schools on the Gold Coast, Queensland
Public high schools in Queensland
Southport, Queensland